Andi is a rural town in Wucheng District of Jinhua, eastern China's Zhejiang province. The town is bordered to the north by Sumeng Township, to the east by Yafan Town, to the southeast by Wuyi County, and to the southwest by Liyang Township. It is hailed as the "Hometown of Osmanthus fragrans in China".

History
During the Republic of China, it belonged to Annan District.

In May 1949 it was renamed Andi Township.

In 1961 its name was changed into Andi People's Commune.

In 1992, Andi Township and Waifan Township were merged into one town named "Andi Town".

In March 2017, Yusi Village was listed among the fourth batch of "Beautiful and Livable Villages" by the State Council of China.

Geography
Water resources are abundant here. Mei Stream, Longtan Stream, Waifan Stream, Shanggan Stream and Yagan Stream are major rivers in the town.

Andi Reservoir is the largest body of water in the town.

Attractions
Andi Reservoir, also known as Xianyuan Lake, is a famous scenic spot.

References

Divisions of Wucheng District
Towns of Jinhua